Tredozio is a comune (municipality) in the Province of Forlì-Cesena in the Italian region Emilia-Romagna, located about  southeast of Bologna and about  southwest of Forlì.

Tredozio borders the following municipalities: Marradi, Modigliana, Portico e San Benedetto, Rocca San Casciano.

Demographic evolution

Twin towns
 Arcevia, Italy
 Hofbieber, Germany

References

External links
 Official website

 Photos

Cities and towns in Emilia-Romagna